Cheilanthoideae is one of the five subfamilies of the fern family Pteridaceae. The subfamily is thought to be monophyletic, but some of the genera into which it has been divided are not, and the taxonomic status of many of its genera and species remains uncertain, with radically different approaches in use .

Phylogenic relationships
The following phylogram shows a likely relationship between Cheilanthoideae and the other Pteridaceae subfamilies.

Although subfamily Cheilanthoideae itself is thought to be monophyletic, many of the genera into which it has been divided (including Cheilanthes, Doryopteris, Notholaena, and Pellaea) have been shown to be polyphyletic.

Genera
The division of the subfamily Cheilanthoideae into genera and species remains uncertain . Christenhusz et al. (2011), the Pteridophyte Phylogeny Group classification of 2016 (PPG I), and the November 2019 version of the Checklist of Ferns and Lycophytes of the World (World Ferns 8.11) agree on the following genera:

 Adiantopsis Fée
 Aleuritopteris Fée
 Argyrochosma (J.Sm.) Windham
 Aspidotis (Nutt. ex Hooker) Copel.
 Astrolepis D.M.Benham & Windham
 Bommeria E.Fourn.
 Calciphilopteris Yesilyurt & H.Schneid.
 Cheilanthes Sw. (nom. cons.)
 Cheiloplecton Fée
 Doryopteris J.Sm. (nom. cons.)
 Gaga Pryer, F.W. Li & Windham
 Hemionitis L.
 Lytoneuron (Klotzsch) Yesilyurt
 Mildella Trev.
 Myriopteris Fée
 Notholaena R.Br.
 Ormopteris J.Sm.
 Paragymnopteris K.H.Shing
 Pellaea Link (nom. cons.)
 Pentagramma Yatsk., Windham & E.Wollenw.
 Trachypteris André ex Christ.

Some other genera that have been included in the subfamily (or split off from genera included in the subfamily) are:
 Allosorus Bernh. – not included by Christenhusz et al. (2011); accepted in PPG I; World Ferns 8.11 includes it in Aleuritopteris, saying that it was wrongly typified
 Baja Windham & L.O.George – accepted by World Ferns 8.11
 Mickelopteris Fraser-Jenk. – accepted by World Ferns 8.11
 Oeosporangium Vis. – included in Allosorus in PPG I; re-accepted by World Ferns 8.11
 Parahemionitis Panigrahi – accepted by Christenhusz et al. (2011) and PPG I; considered a synonym of Paragymnopteris by World Ferns 8.11, which places the species Parahemionitis cordata in the monotypic genus Mickelopteris
 Pteridella Mett. ex Kuhn – accepted by Christenhusz & Chase (2014); considered a synonym of Pellaea by World Ferns 8.11

Other sources take a radically different approach. , Plants of the World Online places all of the possible genera of the Cheilanthoideae in the single genus Hemionitis. (Parahemionitis is treated as a synonym of Acrostichum, a member of a different subfamily.)

While much work remains to be done in delineating monophyletic genera in the cheilanthoids (Cheilanthes, Doryopteris and Pellaea remaining notably polyphyletic), several major clades have been consistently recovered in phylogenetic analyses and given informal names, as shown here:

References

Pteridaceae
Plant subfamilies